Mycobacterium hodleri is a species of the phylum Actinomycetota (Gram-positive bacteria with high guanine and cytosine content, one of the dominant phyla of all bacteria), belonging to the genus Mycobacterium.

Description
Gram-positive, nonmotile and acid-fast rods (1 µm x 1.8-2.3 µm).

Colony characteristics
Scotochromogenic colonies, production of a saffron yellow pigment on Middlebrook 7H10 agar and a chrome yellow pigment on trypticase soy agar.

Physiology
Fast growth on Middlebrook 7H10 and on trypticase soy agar at temperatures between 18 °C and 28 °C.
Capable of cooxidizing fluoranthene with polycyclic aromatic hydrocarbons, including pyrene and anthracene.

Pathogenesis
Pathogenicity is not known.
Biosafety level 1

Type strain
First isolated from a fluoranthene-contaminated site near Jülich, Germany.
Strain EMI2 = CIP 104909 = DSM 44183 = JCM 12141 = LMG 19253

References

Kleespies et al. 1996. Mycobacterium hodleri sp. nov., a new member of the fast-growing mycobacteria capable of degrading polycyclic aromatic hydrocarbons. Int. J. Syst. Bacteriol., 46, 683–687.

External links
Type strain of Mycobacterium hodleri at BacDive -  the Bacterial Diversity Metadatabase

Acid-fast bacilli
hodleri
Bacteria described in 1996